The Österreichische Basketball Bundesliga (ÖBL) Most Valuable Austrian Player is an award given to the best player in the Österreichische Basketball Bundesliga, the highest professional basketball league in Austria. The award goes to the best Austrian player in the league, and was first handed out in the 2003–04 season.

Winner

Sources
Individual awards at oebl.at

Österreichische Basketball Bundesliga awards